Cerrillos (English: Hillocks) is a commune of Chile located in a midtown area of Santiago and the southwest of the city — in the Santiago Province, Santiago Metropolitan Region — as a spot of the conurbation of Santiago. The commune was created in 1991 from a subdivision of Maipú.

Administration
As a commune, Cerrillos is a third-level administrative division of Chile administered by a municipal council, headed by an alcalde who is directly elected every four years. The 2012-2016 mayor is Arturo Aguirre Gacitúa (PS), and the council has the following members:
 Juan De Dios Jiménez Retamal (RN)
 Orfilia Castro Tobar (PPD)
 María Luisa Figueroa Garrido (PS)
 Cecilia Foncea Astudillo (DC)
 Felipe Martinez Calderón (IND)
 Guillermo Reeves Iriarte (RN)

Within the electoral divisions of Chile, Cerillos is represented in the Chamber of Deputies as a part of the 20th electoral district (together with Estación Central and Maipú). The commune is represented in the Senate as part of the 7th senatorial constituency (Santiago-West).

Demographics
At that time, there were 34,961 men and 36,945 women. The population fell 1.0% (743 persons) between the 1992 and 2002 censuses.

Other statistics
Average annual household income: US$22,234 (PPP, 2006)
Population below poverty line: 8.3% (2006)
Regional quality of life index: 72.93, medium, 32 out of 52 (2005)
Human Development Index: 0.743, 54 out of 341 (2003)

See also

 Villa Mexico (small town of cerrillos)

References

External links
  Municipality of Cerrillos

Populated places in Santiago Province, Chile
Communes of Chile
Geography of Santiago, Chile
1991 establishments in Chile